The Africa Leadership Forum (ALF) is a not-for-profit organization founded in Nigeria in 1988 by Nigerian president Olusegun Obasanjo.  

The primary focus of ALF is to help improve the current quality of leadership in Africa while at the same time helping to train the next generation of leaders for the continent. ALF provided the first forum where leaders could meet and exchange experiences with the view to improving their performance.

ALF has spearheaded regional and continent-wide initiatives such as the Conference on Security, Stability, Development and Cooperation (CSSDCA), now a standing conference of the African Union, and the Africa Women's Forum. Within Nigeria, ALF holds programs such as the Farmhouse Dialogs that allow participants on both sides of important and/or controversial issues to sit down together and discuss their concerns.

In 2001 ALF opened a new secretariat in Benja Village, Ota, Ogun State. This new complex includes a large conference hall, a digital library, Internet cafe, and training rooms.

External links
 www.africaleadership.org Official website

African Union
Think tanks based in Nigeria
1998 establishments in Nigeria
Organizations established in 1998